Al-Khisal (Arabic:الخصال) or The Book of Characters by Ibn Babawayh is a book about morals and religious beliefs.

Contents
Al-Khisal contains narrations about ethics, religious beliefs, and other subjects. The book has 26 numbered parts and includes 1,225 hadith. In Al-Khisal, Shaykh Saduq has prepared a collection of traditions in an interesting way. The main themes of the traditions are ethics, manners and good characteristics. All the traditions are presented with a complete record of transmission. Furthermore, they are divided into different groups according to numbers e.g. all the traditions related to the number one are gathered in one part then traditions related to number two and so on. It starts with one and ends with one million. Al-Khisal seems to be the first on record to be compiled with this style. Moreover, Al-Khisal is a great encyclopedia on Islamic knowledge and many authoritative works on Shi'ite traditions such as Bihar Al-Anwar have cited it as a reference. Shaykh Saduq reports: Investigating in works of precedent man of religious sciences and Islamic sages, I find out that they wrote many books in different part of science but it was not written by them along with relations between numbers and good or bad characters alike. I write a book with this harmony for the sake of nearing to Allah.

Validity
While a short book, Al-Khisal is nonetheless counted as a great encyclopedia for Islamic knowledge and forbidden, permissible judgment. It refers also to historical, interpretative, philosophical points and political subjects in the preface, written by Sayyed Ahmad Fehri Zanjani. Also we found interesting book about the Hadith school of Qom.

Authenticity
Along with other books by Ibn Babawayh, Al-Khisal has been studied by jurists and theologians. Most of the book's narrations have been reported by other authentic Shiite books, such as The Four Books and Bihar al-Anwar.

See also
List of Shi'a books

References

External links
 Al-Khisal at the Encyclopedia of Islam

Shia literature
Shia theology books